Tuomas Kansikas (born 15 May 1981) is a Finnish former footballer. In 2014, he retired from professional football at the age of 32.

References
Guardian Football

External links
 Profile at HJK.fi
 Stats at Veikkausliiga.com

1981 births
Living people
People from Valkeala
Finnish footballers
Association football defenders
Veikkausliiga players
Helsingin Jalkapalloklubi players
Myllykosken Pallo −47 players
Sportspeople from Kymenlaakso